The languages of East Timor include both Austronesian and Papuan languages. (See Timor–Flores languages and Timor–Alor–Pantar languages.) The lingua franca and national language of East Timor is Tetum, an Austronesian language influenced by Portuguese, with which it has equal status as an official language. The language of the Ocussi exclave is Uab Meto (Dawan). Fataluku is a Papuan language widely used in the eastern part of the country (often more so than Tetum). Both Portuguese and Tetum have official recognition under the Constitution of East Timor, as do other indigenous languages, including: Bekais, Bunak, Galoli, Habun, Idalaka, Kawaimina, Kemak, Lovaia, Makalero, Makasae, Mambai, Tokodede and Wetarese.

The rise of lingua francas in the linguistically diverse East Timor and the domination of several clans over others have led to the extinction of many smaller languages. However, some of them are still in use as ritual languages or cants. Research done in the mid-2000s by the Dutch linguist Aone van Engelenhoven, for example, revealed that the Makuva language, formerly spoken by the Makuva tribe but believed to have been extinct since the 1950s, was still used occasionally.

In 2007, Van Engelenhoven discovered the existence of another language that was essentially extinct, called Rusenu.

Official languages

Section 13(1) of the 2002 constitution designates Portuguese and Tetum as East Timor's two official languages. The same section also provides that "Tetum and the other national languages shall be valued and developed by the State." English and Indonesian are sometimes used and section 159 of the constitution provides that these languages serve as "working languages within civil service side by side with official languages as long as deemed necessary".

Under Portuguese rule, all education was through the medium of Portuguese, although it coexisted with Tetum and other languages. Portuguese particularly influenced the dialect of Tetum spoken in the capital, Dili, known as Tetun Prasa, as opposed to the more traditional version spoken in rural areas, known as Tetun Terik. Tetun Prasa is the version more widely used, and is now taught in schools.

Under Indonesian rule from 1976 to 1999, East Timor's official language was Indonesian; It, Along with English, currently has the status of a 'working language' under the present constitution.

For many older East Timorese, the Indonesian language has negative connotations with the Suharto regime, but many younger people expressed suspicion or hostility to the reinstatement of Portuguese, which they saw as a 'colonial language' in much the same way that Indonesians saw Dutch. However, whereas the Dutch culture and language had limited influence on those of Indonesia, the East Timorese and Portuguese cultures became intertwined, particularly through intermarriage, as did the languages. Portuguese was also a working language of the resistance against Indonesia.

Some young East Timorese felt at a disadvantage by the adoption of Portuguese as an official language, and accused the country's leaders of favouring the older generations who speak Portuguese and educated Timorese who had only recently returned from overseas, arguing that those older East Timorese who speak Portuguese or English had more job opportunities. 
 
Many foreign observers, especially from Australia and Southeast Asia were also critical about the reinstatement of Portuguese, arguing that English or Indonesian would have been preferable. In spite of this, many Australian linguists have been closely involved with the official language policy, including the promotion of Portuguese.

Portugal and other Portuguese language countries such as Brazil have supported the teaching of Portuguese in East Timor. Some people in East Timor complained that teachers from Portugal and Brazil were poorly equipped to teach in the country, as they did not know local languages, or understand the local culture. 
 
Nevertheless, the late Sérgio Vieira de Mello, who headed the United Nations Transitional Administration in East Timor, was a Brazilian who established a close working relationship with Xanana Gusmão, the country's first president, as a fellow Portuguese-speaker but was respected by many East Timorese because of his efforts to learn Tetum.

Languages by speakers

Languages by number of native speakers

Literacy rates by language
Literacy rates (in percentage terms) in the co-official and working languages for East Timorese people aged 15–24 in 2004 and 2010. This shows which percentage of the age group is able to speak, read and write any of the four main lingua francas of East Timor, either as a native or second language. Data are derived from Highlights of the 2010 census main results in Timor-Leste.

Distribution of languages, 2010

Notes

References
National Institute of Linguistics, National University of East Timor
"The languages of East Timor", by Dr. Geoffrey Hull, at the Timorese National Institute of Linguistics
Current Language Issues in East Timor (Dr Geoffrey Hull)
Interview given by Dr. Geoffrey Hull to the programme "Lingua Franca", in Radio National

External links 

 Pictures from a Portuguese language course using Tetum published in the East Timorese newspaper :pt:Lia Foun in Díli
Línguas no Timor website in Portuguese, but contains links to articles in English
Languages of Timor Lorosae - part of Ethnologue
The Languages of East Timor: Some Basic Facts
FATALUKU COMMUNITY: English and Fataluku Website for researching the Fataluku Language
YouTube video of José Ramos-Horta commenting on East Timor's official and working languages